The ITF rankings are the current rankings of national teams by the International Tennis Federation in both men's and women's tennis. The ITF produces two sets of rankings—the ITF Davis Cup Nations Ranking for male national teams, and the ITF Fed Cup Nations Ranking for female national teams. Both sets of rankings measure the success of all nations participating in both competitions.

The ITF Davis Cup Nations Ranking was launched at the end of 2001 and the ITF Fed Cup Nations Ranking was introduced a year later. Both rankings are updated following every World Group round and are used for seeding the highest ranked teams in the draws for each group in the competitions' structures.

Ranking method

The ITF Davis Cup and Fed Cup rankings are based in a rolling four year cumulative system. However, the points total for each nation is calculated following a weighted sum formula, in which recent results are weighted more heavily. After each World Group round, the ranking period adjusts, and points earned in the last year period have a weighting factor of 100% in the points total. At the same time, the weighting factor for the points earned until the same round in the previous three years is reduced to 75% (for points earned one to two years ago), 50% (for points earned two to three years ago) and 25% (for points earned three to four years ago).

Ranking points are awarded only to the winning nation of a competition tie at every round. Victories in World Group rounds are worth more points than those in Zone Groups, and ties at the later rounds of the competition are progressively worth more points. Bonus points are also awarded for a nation that defeats a higher-ranked nation, but only if the latter nation is ranked in the top 64 for the Davis Cup, or in the top 75 for the Fed Cup. Unique to the Davis Cup, there is an additional bonus for a nation that wins a tie in the opponent's home ground: a 25% bonus is added to the total of round points and ranking bonus points (if any). At the Fed Cup only, nations that win by walkover are awarded round points but no bonus points, and no points are awarded for consolation events.

Men

The current ranking points and bonus points distribution tables for the Davis Cup are shown below:

Notes

1 Bonus points, as shown above, for defeating higher ranked nations will be added when appropriate to each tie in World Group, Group I and Group II.

2 Bonus points do not apply in Groups III and IV.

3 If the number of teams in Europe/Africa Groups I and II exceeds 16 or the number of teams in Asia/Oceania and Americas Groups I and II exceeds eight, then 200 points will be awarded for a first round win, 400 for a second round win and 600 for a third round win.

Women

The current ranking points and bonus points distribution tables for the Fed Cup are shown below:

Notes

1 Bonus points, as shown above, for defeating higher ranked nations will be added when appropriate to each tie in World Group, Group I and Group II.

2 In the Groups I, II and III a nation's points are determined by its overall finishing position. Formats vary according to the numbers of nations playing each year so the value of each win alters too. However the maximum points a nation can win at each level remains constant.

Current rankings

Men

†Change since previous ranking update

Women

†Change since previous ranking update

Number 1 ranked nations

Men

Women

Notes and references

International Tennis Federation
Sports world rankings